Sandra Dorne (born Joan Smith; 19 June 1924 – 25 December 1992) was a British actress.

Career

Also known as Sandra Holt, Dorne was often known in the 1950s as the B-film Diana Dors. As a platinum blonde, she was a regular female lead in B-films in the late 1940s and early 1950s. She trained at the Rank Organisation's "charm school". Film roles dried up as she grew older, but she still found work and acted mainly in British television, appearing in such series as Z-Cars, The Avengers and The Third Man.

Personal life
Married to the actor Patrick Holt from 1954 until her death, Dorne died on Christmas Day 1992 at Paddington Community Hospital, Westminster, London. The cause of death was kidney cancer.

Partial filmography

 Eyes That Kill (1947) – Joan
 Saraband for Dead Lovers (1948) – (uncredited)
 A Piece of Cake (1948) – Minor Role (uncredited)
 Once a Jolly Swagman (1949) – Kay Fox
 All Over the Town (1949) – Marlene
 Marry Me! (1949) – Giggly Girl (uncredited)
 Don't Ever Leave Me (1949) – Ruby Baines
 Helter Skelter (1949) – Receptionist
 Golden Arrow (1949) – 2nd Nightclub hostess
 The Miniver Story (1950) – Girl in Tartan, VE Day pub (uncredited)
 The Clouded Yellow (1950) – Kyra
 Traveller's Joy (1950) – Flower Shop Assistant
 Don't Say Die (1950) – Sandra
 Happy Go Lovely (1951) – Betty
 13 East Street (1952) – Judy
 Hindle Wakes (1952) – Mary Hollins
 The Yellow Balloon (1953) – Iris
 Alf's Baby (1953) – Enid
 The Beggar's Opera (1953) – Sukey Tawdrey
 Wheel of Fate (1953) – Lucky Price
 Marilyn (1953) – Marilyn Saunders
 The Weak and the Wicked (1954) – Stella
 The Good Die Young (1954) – Pretty Girl
 Police Dog (1955) – Blonde
 Alias John Preston (1955) – Sylvia – In Dream / Maria
 The Gelignite Gang (1956) – Sally Morton
 The Iron Petticoat (1956) – Tityana
 Operation Murder (1957) – Pat Wayne
 Three Sundays to Live (1957) – Ruth Chapman
 Orders to Kill (1958) – Blonde with German Officer
 The Bank Raiders (1958) – Della Byrne
 Not a Hope in Hell (1960) – Diana Melton
 The House in Marsh Road (1960) – Valerie Stockley
 The Amorous Prawn (1962) – Busty Babs
 The Secret Door (1964) – Sonia
 Devil Doll (1964) – Magda
 All Coppers Are... (1972) – Sue's mother
 Joseph Andrews (1977) – Whore in Traffic Jam
 The Playbirds (1978) – Dougan's Secretary
 Five Go Mad in Dorset (1982, TV Series) – Aunt Fanny
 Eat the Rich (1987) – Sandra (final film role)

External links
 

English film actresses
English television actresses
1924 births
1992 deaths
People from Keighley
Actresses from Yorkshire
20th-century English actresses
Deaths from kidney cancer
Deaths from cancer in England